Comstock is a surname of English origin. Notable people with the surname include:

A. B. Comstock (1857–1937), American politician
Ada Comstock (1876–1973), U.S. women's education pioneer
Adam Comstock (1740–1819), Revolutionary War veteran and New York politician
Albert C. Comstock (1845–1910), New York lawyer and politician
Anna Botsford Comstock (1854–1930), U.S. artist, educator, and conservationist
Anthony Comstock (1844–1915), U.S. moral reformer and namesake of the Comstock laws
Barbara Comstock (born 1959), member of the U.S. House of Representatives
Bobby Comstock (1941–2020), American rock and roll singer
Charles Carter Comstock (1818–1900), U.S. politician from Michigan
Christopher Comstock (1635–1702), early settler of Norwalk, Connecticut and a deputy of the General Assembly of the Colony of Connecticut
Christopher Comstock (born 1992), birth name of Marshmello, American electronic dance music producer and DJ
Cicero Comstock (1817–1871), Wisconsin state senator, Milwaukee comptroller
Cyrus B. Comstock (1831–1910), U.S. Army corps of engineers officer, member of the NAS
Rev. Cyrus Comstock (1765-1853), New York State preacher and inventor of the horse-drawn buckboard wagon.
Daniel Frost Comstock (1883–1970), U.S. physicist and engineer
Daniel Webster Comstock (1840–1917), U.S. politician from Indiana
Dorothy Comstock Riley (1924–2004), lawyer and judge from the U.S. state of Michigan
Frank Comstock (1922–2013), American music arranger, composer and conductor
Frank Comstock (politician) (1856–1914), American politician
George F. Comstock (1811–1892), Chief Judge of the New York Court of Appeals 1860–1861
George G. Comstock (1855–1934), American astronomer
Helen Field Comstock (1840–1930), American poet, philanthropist
Henry Tompkins (or Thomas) Paige Comstock (1820–1870), American miner after whom Comstock Lode was named
Harriet Theresa Comstock (1860–1925), American novelist and author of children's books
Isaac N. Comstock (1808–1883), New York politician and prison warden
John Henry Comstock (1849–1931), U.S. entomologist, co-creator of the Comstock-Needham system
Keith Comstock (born 1955), major league baseball player
Nanette Comstock (1866–1942), Broadway actress
Noah D. Comstock (1832–1890), American politician
Oliver C. Comstock (1780–1860), U.S. politician from New York
Samuel Comstock (1680–1752), member of the Connecticut House of Representatives from Norwalk, Connecticut 
Solomon Gilman Comstock (1842–1933), U.S. politician from Minnesota
William Comstock (1877–1949), Governor of Michigan
William Henry Comstock (1830–1919), American-Canadian businessman and politician

Fictional characters:
Earl Comstock, character in Neal Stephenson's novel Cryptonomicon
Gordon Comstock, character in George Orwell's novel Keep the Aspidistra Flying
Julian Comstock, character in Robert Charles Wilson's novel Julian Comstock: A Story of 22nd-Century America
Radborne Comstock, character in Elizabeth Hand's novel Mortal Love
Roger Comstock, character in Neal Stephenson's The Baroque Cycle of novels
Zachary Hale Comstock, main antagonist in the video game BioShock Infinite
Magenta Comstock: historical figure within the universe of the Harry Potter franchise